Camp Roberts can refer to:

 Camp Roberts, California
 Camp Roberts, Indiana
 Camp Roberts, a small camp within Kandahar International Airport